Essex North was an electoral riding in Ontario, Canada. It was created in 1875 when the riding of Essex was split into Essex North and Essex South. It was renamed in 1967 to Essex-Kent before changing back to Essex North in 1975. It was changed back to Essex-Kent again in 1987 and finally was abolished in 1996 before the 1999 election.

Members of Provincial Parliament

References

Former provincial electoral districts of Ontario